Stewart's Tavern, also known as John Stewart's Tavern Inn, is a historic inn and tavern located near Short Gap, Mineral County, West Virginia. It is a 2 1/2 story building that was built in the latter part of the 18th century with hand hewn chestnut logs having steeple notching.  It sits on a stone foundation and has a side gable roof. The building was purchased by the Frankfort District Historical Society in 1988, and moved in 1989 approximately 60 feet from its original location to its present site.

It was listed on the National Register of Historic Places in 2000.

References

Hotel buildings on the National Register of Historic Places in West Virginia
Buildings and structures in Mineral County, West Virginia
National Register of Historic Places in Mineral County, West Virginia
Drinking establishments on the National Register of Historic Places in West Virginia
Relocated buildings and structures in West Virginia
Log buildings and structures on the National Register of Historic Places in West Virginia